Mesenchymal stem cells (MSCs) also known as mesenchymal stromal cells or medicinal signaling cells are multipotent stromal cells that can differentiate into a variety of cell types, including osteoblasts (bone cells), chondrocytes (cartilage cells), myocytes (muscle cells) and adipocytes (fat cells which give rise to marrow adipose tissue).

Structure

Definition
While the terms mesenchymal stem cell (MSC) and marrow stromal cell have been used interchangeably for many years, neither term is sufficiently descriptive:

 Mesenchyme is embryonic connective tissue that is derived from the mesoderm and that differentiates into hematopoietic and connective tissue, whereas MSCs do not differentiate into hematopoietic cells.
 Stromal cells are connective tissue cells that form the supportive structure in which the functional cells of the tissue reside. While this is an accurate description for one function of MSCs, the term fails to convey the relatively recently discovered roles of MSCs in the repair of tissue.
 The term encompasses multipotent cells derived from other non-marrow tissues, such as placenta, umbilical cord blood, adipose tissue, adult muscle, corneal stroma, or the dental pulp of deciduous (baby) teeth. The cells do not have the capacity to reconstitute an entire organ.

Morphology

Mesenchymal stem cells are characterized morphologically by a small cell body with a few cell processes that are long and thin. The cell body contains a large, round nucleus with a prominent nucleolus, which is surrounded by finely dispersed chromatin particles, giving the nucleus a clear appearance. The remainder of the cell body contains a small amount of Golgi apparatus, rough endoplasmic reticulum, mitochondria, and polyribosomes. The cells, which are long and thin, are widely dispersed, and the adjacent extracellular matrix is populated by a few reticular fibrils, but is devoid of the other types of collagen fibrils. These distinctive morphological features of mesenchymal stem cells can be visualized label-free using live cell imaging.

Location

Bone marrow 
Bone marrow was the original source of MSCs, and is still the most frequently utilized source. These bone marrow stem cells do not contribute to the formation of blood cells, and so do not express the hematopoietic stem cell marker CD34. They are sometimes referred to as bone marrow stromal stem cells.

Cord cells 
The youngest and most primitive MSCs may be obtained from umbilical cord tissue, namely Wharton's jelly and the umbilical cord blood. However, MSCs are found in much higher concentration in the Wharton's jelly compared to cord blood, which is a rich source of hematopoietic stem cells. The umbilical cord is available after a birth. It is normally discarded, and poses no risk for collection. These MSCs may prove to be a useful source of MSCs for clinical applications, due to their primitive properties and fast growth rate.

These cells have several advantages over bone-marrow-derived MSCs. Adipose-tissue-derived MSCs (AdMSCs), in addition to being easier and safer to isolate than bone-marrow-derived MSCs, can be obtained in larger quantities.

Molar cells 
The developing tooth bud of the mandibular third molar is a rich source of MSCs. While they are described as multipotent, it is possible that they are pluripotent. They eventually form enamel, dentin, blood vessels, dental pulp, and nervous tissues. These stem cells are capable of differentiating into chondrocytes, cardiomyocytes, melanocytes, and hepatocyte‐like cells in vitro.

Amniotic fluid 
Stem cells are present in amniotic fluid. As many as 1 in 100 cells collected during amniocentesis are pluripotent mesenchymal stem cells.

Function

Differentiation capacity
MSCs have a great capacity for self-renewal while maintaining their multipotency. Recent work suggests that β-catenin, via regulation of EZH2, is a central molecule in maintaining the "stemness" of MSC's. The standard test to confirm multipotency is differentiation of the cells into osteoblasts, adipocytes and chondrocytes as well as myocytes.

MSCs have been seen to even differentiate into neuron-like cells, but doubt remains about whether the MSC-derived neurons are functional. The degree to which the culture will differentiate varies among individuals and how differentiation is induced, e.g., chemical vs. mechanical; and it is not clear whether this variation is due to a different amount of "true" progenitor cells in the culture or variable differentiation capacities of individuals' progenitors. The capacity of cells to proliferate and differentiate is known to decrease with the age of the donor, as well as the time in culture. Likewise, whether this is due to a decrease in the number of MSCs or a change to the existing MSCs is not known.

Immunomodulatory effects
MSCs have an effect on innate and specific immune cells, and research has shown an ability to suppress tumor growth. MSCs produce many immunomodulatory molecules including prostaglandin E2 (PGE2), nitric oxide, indoleamine 2,3-dioxygenase (IDO), interleukin 6 (IL-6), and other surface markers such as FasL, PD-L1 and PD-L2.

MSCs have an effect on macrophages, neutrophils, NK cells, mast cells and dendritic cells in innate immunity. MSCs are able to migrate to the site of injury, where they polarize through PGE2 macrophages in M2 phenotype which is characterized by an anti-inflammatory effect. Further, PGE2 inhibits the ability of mast cells to degranulate and produce TNF-α. Proliferation and cytotoxic activity of NK cells is inhibited by PGE2 and IDO. MSCs also reduce the expression of NK cell receptors - NKG2D, NKp44 and NKp30. MSCs inhibit respiratory flare and apoptosis of neutrophils by production of cytokines IL-6 and IL-8. Differentiation and expression of dendritic cell surface markers is inhibited by IL-6 and PGE2 of MSCs. The immunosuppressive effects of MSC also depend on IL-10, but it is not certain whether they produce it alone, or only stimulate other cells to produce it.

MSC expresses the adhesion molecules VCAM-1 and ICAM-1, which allow T-lymphocytes to adhere to their surface. Then MSC can affect them by molecules which have a short half-life and their effect is in the immediate vicinity of the cell. These include nitric oxide, PGE2, HGF, and activation of receptor PD-1. MSCs reduce T cell proliferation between G0 and G1 cell cycle phases and decrease the expression of IFNγ of Th1 cells while increasing the expression of IL-4 of Th2 cells. MSCs also inhibit the proliferation of B-lymphocytes between G0 and G1 cell cycle phases.

Antimicrobial properties 
MSCs produce several antimicrobial peptides (AMPs) including human cathelicidin LL-37, β-defensins, lipocalin 2 and hepcidin. These peptides, together with the enzyme indoleamine 2,3-dioxygenase (IDO), are responsible for the broad-spectrum antibacterial activity of MSCs.

Clinical significance

Mesenchymal stem cells can be activated and mobilized if needed but their efficiency, in the case of muscle repair for example, is currently quite low. Further studies into the mechanisms of MSC action may provide avenues for increasing their capacity for tissue repair.

Autoimmune disease 
Clinical studies investigating the efficacy of mesenchymal stem cells in treating diseases are in preliminary development, particularly for understanding autoimmune diseases, graft versus host disease, Crohn's disease, multiple sclerosis, systemic lupus erythematosus and systemic sclerosis. As of 2014, no high-quality clinical research provides evidence of efficacy, and numerous inconsistencies and problems exist in the research methods.

Other diseases
Many of the early clinical successes using intravenous transplantation came in systemic diseases such as graft versus host disease and sepsis.  Direct injection or placement of cells into a site in need of repair may be the preferred method of treatment, as vascular delivery suffers from a "pulmonary first pass effect" where intravenous injected cells are sequestered in the lungs.

Detection
The International Society for Cellular Therapy (ISCT) has proposed a set of standards to define MSCs. A cell can be classified as an MSC if it shows plastic adherent properties under normal culture conditions and has a fibroblast-like morphology. In fact, some argue that MSCs and fibroblasts are functionally identical. Furthermore, MSCs can undergo osteogenic, adipogenic and chondrogenic differentiation ex vivo. The cultured MSCs also express on their surface CD73, CD90 and CD105, while lacking the expression of CD11b, CD14, CD19, CD34, CD45, CD79a and HLA-DR surface markers.

Research
The majority of modern culture techniques still take a colony-forming unit-fibroblasts (CFU-F) approach, where raw unpurified bone marrow or ficoll-purified bone marrow mononuclear cells are plated directly into cell culture plates or flasks. Mesenchymal stem cells, but not red blood cells or haematopoetic progenitors, are adherent to tissue culture plastic within 24 to 48 hours. However, at least one publication has identified a population of non-adherent MSCs that are not obtained by the direct-plating technique.

Other flow cytometry-based methods allow the sorting of bone marrow cells for specific surface markers, such as STRO-1. STRO-1+ cells are generally more homogenous and have higher rates of adherence and higher rates of proliferation, but the exact differences between STRO-1+ cells and MSCs are not clear.

Methods of immunodepletion using such techniques as MACS have also been used in the negative selection of MSCs.

The supplementation of basal media with fetal bovine serum or human platelet lysate is common in MSC culture. 
Prior to the use of platelet lysates for MSC culture, the pathogen inactivation process is recommended to prevent pathogen transmission.

New research titled Transplantation of human ESC-derived mesenchymal stem cell spheroids ameliorates spontaneous osteoarthritis in rhesus macaques Various chemicals and methods including low level laser irradiation have been used to increase proliferation of stem cell.

History 
In 1924, Russian-born morphologist Alexander A. Maximov; used extensive histological findings to identify a singular type of precursor cell within mesenchyme that develops into different types of blood cells.

Scientists Ernest A. McCulloch and James E. Till first revealed the clonal nature of marrow cells in the 1960s. An ex vivo assay for examining the clonogenic potential of multipotent marrow cells was later reported in the 1970s by Friedenstein and colleagues. In this assay system, stromal cells were referred to as colony-forming unit-fibroblasts (CFU-f).

The first clinical trials of MSCs were completed in 1995 when a group of 15 patients were injected with cultured MSCs to test the safety of the treatment. Since then, more than 200 clinical trials have been started. However, most are still in the safety stage of testing.

Subsequent experimentation revealed the plasticity of marrow cells and how their fate is determined by environmental cues. Culturing marrow stromal cells in the presence of osteogenic stimuli such as ascorbic acid, inorganic phosphate and dexamethasone could promote their differentiation into osteoblasts. In contrast, the addition of transforming growth factor-beta (TGF-b) could induce chondrogenic markers.

Controversies 
More recently, there has been some debate over the use of the term "mesenchymal stem cells" and what constitutes the most scientifically correct meaning for the MSC acronym. Most mesenchymal cell or "MSC" preps only contain a minority fraction of true multipotent stem cells, while most cells are instead stromal in nature. One of the pioneers in the MSC field, Dr. Arnold Caplan, has proposed re-naming MSCs to mean "medicinal signaling cells." Within the stem cell field MSC has most commonly now come to refer to "mesenchymal stromal/stem cells" because of the heterogeneous nature of the cellular preparations. 

There is also growing concern about the marketing and injection of MSCs and mesenchymal stem cells into patients by for-profit clinics that lack rigorous data to back up these clinical uses.

See also 

 Bone marrow
Fibroblast
 Intramembranous ossification
 Mesenchyme
 Multipotency
 Cord lining
 Marrow Adipose Tissue (MAT)
List of human cell types derived from the germ layers

References

Further reading

External links 
  scientist-reviewed and not too technical
 

Stem cells